The  Dunnavant's Building is a historic commercial building in Huntsville, Alabama.  It was built in 1905 by dry goods company Terry Brothers & Rogers.  P. S. Dunnavant took control of the company in 1925, and the store remained in its downtown location until 1975.  The third floor and roof were damaged in a fire in 1940.  The ground floor on the Washington Street façade is framed by large brick piers with polished marble bases.  Large display windows flank a recessed entry with a central column flush with the façade.  All other windows are one-over-one sashes.  A row of small, evenly spaced arched windows line the ground floor along the Clinton Avenue side.   On the second floor façade there are two groups of four windows, each group sharing a stone sill.  Third floor windows are smaller, and joined by brick arches.  Windows along the Clinton Avenue side are similarly treated.  The building is topped with a simple, denticulated cornice, with the roofline stepping down towards the rear of the building.  The building was listed on the National Register of Historic Places in 1980.

References

National Register of Historic Places in Huntsville, Alabama
Commercial buildings on the National Register of Historic Places in Alabama
Commercial buildings completed in 1905
Buildings and structures in Huntsville, Alabama
1905 establishments in Alabama